The 1940–41 Cincinnati Bearcats men's basketball team represented the University of Cincinnati during the 1940–41 NCAA men's basketball season. The head coach was Clark Ballard, coaching his second season with the Bearcats. The team finished with an overall record of 6–12.

Schedule

|-

References

Cincinnati Bearcats men's basketball seasons
Cincinnati
Cincinnati Bearcats men's basketball team
Cincinnati Bearcats men's basketball team